Charles Curtis "Tuc" Watkins III (born September 2, 1966) is an American actor, known for his roles as David Vickers on One Life to Live, Mr. Burns in The Mummy, Bob Hunter on Desperate Housewives, Congressman Roger Harris on Black Monday, Hank in The Boys in the Band, Troy on The Other Two, and Colin McKenna on Uncoupled.

Early life and education 
Charles Curtis Watkins III was born in Kansas City, Kansas. He attended Indiana University where he majored in communications with a triple minor in theatre, psychology, and French. He has a younger sister, Courtney, born in 1968.

Career
Watkins started his career with guest appearances on various television series including Baywatch, Get a Life, Melrose Place, and Sisters. He portrayed con-man David Vickers on the ABC soap opera One Life to Live from 1994 to 1996, next joining the soap opera General Hospital in the recurring role of Dr. Pierce Dorman from 1996 to 1997. Watkins went on to star as Malcolm Laffley on the Showtime series Beggars and Choosers for its two-season run from 1999 to 2001. In 1999, he made his film debut in I Think I Do, a small budget independent screwball romantic comedy, playing Sterling Scott, the soap opera hunk boyfriend of Bob, played by Alexis Arquette. He followed this with his first appearance in a big studio production, The Mummy as the near-sighted glasses-wearing tomb raider Burns, later guest-starring on television series such as NYPD Blue, Six Feet Under, and CSI: Crime Scene Investigation. After brief appearances in 2001 and 2002, Watkins rejoined the cast of One Life to Live full-time from 2003 through 2006, with several short term returns to the show in 2007, 2008, and 2009, returning again on a regular basis beginning in June 2010. Soap Opera Digest named Watkins's David their "Most Entertaining Male Character" of 2008, noting that "Time and time again, David's harebrained schemes and Tuc Watkins's side-splitting performances provide amusement we're always sorry to see end."

On October 21, 2007, Watkins made his first appearance on ABC's Emmy-winning primetime series Desperate Housewives as Bob Hunter, a new resident of Wisteria Lane who is a gay lawyer with a husband. He was a recurring character in seasons 4-6 and a series regular in seasons 7-8.

On November 4, 2007 Watkins guest-starred on the Cold Case season 5 episode "World's End". 

In July 2009, a Funny or Die video called The Sentimentalist starring Watkins was ranked number five on Entertainment Weekly "The Must List", which notes the magazine's ten weekly choices among film, television, DVDs, books, music, and online entertainment for "The Top 10 Things We Love This Week".

From 2007-2012, he continued his role of Bob Hunter on Desperate Housewives, staying with the show through its series finale on May 13, 2012.

From 2012-2014, he played the recurring role of Pistol Pete on NBC's Emmy-nominated comedy series Parks and Recreation.

In 2012, he guest starred on several TV series, including Franklin & Bash as Lance,  as Dr. Brett Denning, and Baby Daddy as Hank.

In 2013, he guest starred on Maron as Jerry, Warehouse 13 as Nate, and Anger Management as Jeff.

In 2014, he played the recurring role of Joe Miller on the MTV series Awkward.

In 2015, he played the recurring role of Judge Stephen Schaeffer on the TNT series Major Crimes.

In 2016, he guest starred on It's Always Sunny in Philadelphia as Scott and on Ballers as Jim.

In 2017, he guest starred on EastSiders as Patrick.

In 2018, he played Hank in the 2018 Broadway revival of The Boys in the Band. It was directed by Joe Mantello and opened in previews at the Booth Theatre on April 30, 2018, officially on May 31, and ran until August 11, 2018. This production, staged for the 50th anniversary of the play's original premiere, starred Matt Bomer, Jim Parsons, Zachary Quinto, Andrew Rannells, Charlie Carver, Robin de Jesús, Brian Hutchison, Michael Benjamin Washington, and Watkins. All of the actors who were in the 2018 production are openly gay. This production won the 2019 Tony Award for Best Revival of a Play.

In 2020, Watkins reprised his role as Hank in the Netflix film The Boys in the Band. The film stars the full roster of players from the play's 2018 Broadway revival, comprising a cast of exclusively openly-gay actors, including Jim Parsons, Zachary Quinto, Matt Bomer, Andrew Rannells, Charlie Carver, Robin de Jesús, Brian Hutchison, Michael Benjamin Washington, and Watkins. The film was released on September 30, 2020 on Netflix and received positive reviews from critics.

Also in 2020, he began portraying Congressman Roger Harris on season 2 of Showtime's Emmy-nominated comedy series Black Monday. The series stars Don Cheadle, Andrew Rannells, Regina Hall, Casey Wilson, and Paul Scheer, and follows the employees of second-tier Wall Street trading firm the Jammer Group during the year leading up to "Black Monday", the day when international stock markets crashed in 1987.

In 2021, he began portraying Troy on the hit HBO MAX comedy series The Other Two, starring Heléne Yorke, Drew Tarver, Ken Marino, and Molly Shannon.

In 2022, he began portraying Colin McKenna on the Netflix comedy series Uncoupled, created by Darren Star and Jeffrey Richman. Watkins plays Neil Patrick Harris's ex-boyfriend of 17 years. The series premiered on Netflix on July 29, 2022 to critical acclaim.

Personal life 
Watkins came out as gay on April 26, 2013, in an interview on Marie with Marie Osmond. In that same interview, Watkins announced he had become a single father in December 2012 by welcoming twins Catchen and Curtis via surrogacy.

Since 2019, he has been in a relationship with actor Andrew Rannells. The two met the year before while playing a couple on the Broadway production of The Boys in the Band. They reprised their roles for Netflix's film version of the show and also worked together on Black Monday.

Filmography

Film

Television

Web

Stage

References

External links
 
 
 

1966 births
20th-century American male actors
21st-century American male actors
American male film actors
American male soap opera actors
American male television actors
American gay actors
Indiana University alumni
LGBT people from Kansas
Living people
Male actors from Kansas City, Kansas